Leptosiphon harknessii (syn. Linanthus harknessii) is a species of flowering plant in the phlox family known by the common name Harkness' flaxflower.

Distribution and habitat
The plant is native to western North America, from British Columbia south through California, and eastward to Utah and Idaho.

Description
Leptosiphon harknessii is a petite annual herb threadlike stem no more than about 15 centimeters long. The widely spaced leaves are each divided into very narrow linear lobes up to 1.5 centimeters long.

The inflorescence at the tip of each branch of the stem is a single tiny flower, white or faintly blue in color, which is rolled up into a tube most of the time. The bloom period is June to August.

External links
Calflora Database: Leptosiphon harknessii (Harkness' flaxflower)
Jepson Manual eFlora (TJM2) treatment of Leptosiphon harknessii
UC CalPhotos gallery: Leptosiphon harknessii

harknessii
Flora of British Columbia
Flora of California
Flora of Nevada
Flora of the Northwestern United States
Flora of Utah
Flora of the Cascade Range
Flora of the Sierra Nevada (United States)
Natural history of the California Coast Ranges
Flora without expected TNC conservation status